Diana Carolina Silva Francisco (born October 31, 1997) is a Venezuelan model, environmental activist, singer, actress, cabin crew and beauty pageant titleholder who was crowned Miss Venezuela 2022. She will represent Venezuela at the Miss Universe 2023 pageant.

She was previously crowned Miss Earth Venezuela 2018. She represented Venezuela at the Miss Earth 2018 pageant in Mall of Asia Arena in Pasay, Philippines and placed as one of the Top 8 finalists.

Beginnings and personal life
Diana Silva was born on October 31, 1997 in Caracas, Venezuela. His father is a Peruvian-Venezuelan and his mother is a Luso-Venezuelan.

Her childhood was marked by health problems, at the age of six, she was hospitalized in the oncology department of the Doctor Luis Razetti Hospital in Caracas.

At the age of 13, Silva began modeling, she assures that it was the way she found, to discipline her youth. Also in her beginnings, she held different types of jobs, such as a babysitter, secretary, and production assistant in a ceramics company.

She is a Passenger Cabin Crew graduated from the Caracas Air aeronautical instruction center, she is also an advertising student, Marketing mention.

Her hobbies are dancing, playing the guitar, singing, photography, graphic design. She also likes acting, she has participated in several plays at his university.

She has been part of different social activities with various non-profit organizations, the most prominent being her ecological work that she has been carrying out since 2018, in the Caracas botanical garden, with the aim of recovering green areas, collecting organic waste and plant plants, thus contributing to rehabilitate the vegetal lung of the Venezuelan capital.

Pageants

Miss Earth Venezuela 2018
She managed to be selected to be one of the 24 candidates belonging to Miss Earth Venezuela. Silva participated in the second (2nd) edition of the country's ecological beauty pageant, which took place at the Chacao Municipal Theater in the city of Caracas, Venezuela; on August 12, 2018, representing the state of Lara. At the end of the event, Miss Earth Venezuela 2018 was crowned by the directors of the national pageant, Alyz Henrich and Prince Julio César. In this way, she obtains the pass to the international ecological pageant of Miss Earth, based in Boracay, Aclán, Philippines.

Miss Earth 2018
Silva represented Venezuela in Miss Earth 2018 where she obtained a place in the Top 8 finalists.

During his participation, Silva suffered a blackout that prevented him from continuing to participate in the contest held in the Philippines.

According to statements by Prince Julio César, (president of Miss Earth Venezuela) in an interview with aka Venezuelan TV channel Globovisión, he reported that Diana was not reacting, and the doctors, when taking her blood pressure, had it between 8 and 9, in turn, He indicated that they carried out several tests and put him on oxygen. "When she passed out, she suffered a blow to the cheekbone," he said.

Miss Venezuela 2022
After obtaining her certification as a cabin attendant, Diana ventures into beauty pageants again, this time in Miss Venezuela 2022, where she represented the Capital District, obtaining the title as Miss Venezuela 2022 on November 16, 2022 in an event held in the Polyhedron of Caracas.

Miss Universe 2023
She will represent Venezuela in Miss Universe 2023, in El Salvador, on December 3 of this year in a venue to be announced.

References

External links
Miss Earth Official Website
Miss Earth Venezuela Official Website

1997 births
Living people
Venezuelan beauty pageant winners
Miss Earth 2018 contestants
People from Caracas
Venezuelan people of Peruvian descent
Venezuelan people of Portuguese descent